Blue Plains is a locale in the southwest quadrant of Washington, D.C. The area gives its name to the Blue Plains Advanced Wastewater Treatment Plant.

References

Neighborhoods in Southwest (Washington, D.C.)